Lisbon Cascais-Tejo Regional Airport (Cascais Municipal Aerodrome)  is a regional airport, situated near the village of Tires, in the civil parish of São Domingos de Rana, in the Portuguese municipality of Cascais, approximately  northeast of town of the same name in the Greater Lisbon subregion.

History
On 11 October 1964, the then-President of the Portuguese Republic, Américo Tomás inaugurated the Aerodrome of Tires. The project was born of the initiatives of the Secretary-of-State for Aeronautics and Directorate-general for Civil Aeronautics, as well as the Count of Monte Real. The aerodrome was planned for the area around Areia-Guincho, but installed in Tires, a project of the Directorate and earthmoving performed by the military aeronautics division. By 1973, work on the local was still continuing.

Airlines and destinations
The following airlines operate regular scheduled and charter flights at Cascais Airport:

References

Notes

Sources

External links